Scotura fulviceps is a moth of the family Notodontidae. It is found in Brazil, Guyana and Peru.

References

Moths described in 1874
Notodontidae of South America